Neuhof bei Zossen is a railway station in the village of Neuhof, Brandenburg, Germany. The station lies on the Berlin–Dresden railway and the train services are operated by Deutsche Bahn.

Train services
The station is served by the following service:

Regional services  Rostock / Stralsund - Neustrelitz - Berlin - Wunsdorf-Waldstadt - Elsterwerda

References

External links
VBB website
Berlin-Brandenburg (VBB) network map

Railway stations in Brandenburg
Buildings and structures in Teltow-Fläming
Railway stations in Germany opened in 1878